Valery Stepanovich Storozhik  (born December 7, 1956, Kotelva, Poltava Oblast, Ukrainian SSR, USSR) is a Soviet and Russian stage, voice and film actor. He was awarded title of Honored Artist of the Russian Federation (1995).

Storozhik was the first Russian performer of the role of Jesus in the adaptation of the rock opera Jesus Christ Superstar (Mossovet Theatre, directed by Pavel Khomsky).

Selected filmography 
 1982 — Fairy tales... fairy tales... fairy tales of the old Arbat as Lev Aleksandrovich Gartvig
 1983 — The Story of Voyages as May
 1983 —  The Shore as Knyazhko
 1986 —  Boris Godunov as prince Dmitry Kurbsky
 1993 —  Split as Sergei Zubatov

References

External links 
 
 Valery Storozhik at the Mossovet Theatre's site

1956 births
Living people
Soviet male stage actors
Russian male film actors
Russian male stage actors
Russian male television actors
Russian male voice actors
Soviet male voice actors
Honored Artists of the Russian Federation
People from Poltava Oblast
Russian people of Ukrainian descent